Aspidosperma ramiflorum is a timber tree native to Brazil and Bolivia.

References

ramiflorum
Trees of Brazil
Trees of Bolivia
Plants described in 1860